The 34th government of Turkey (11 December 1971 – 22 May 1972) was a government in the history of Turkey. It is also called the second Erim government.

Background 
Eleven members of the previous government, resigned claiming that they could not carry the reforms they had promised. After this resignation, Nihat Erim also resigned on 3 December 1971. However, the president Cevdet Sunay appointed Nihat Erim for the second time. The second Erim government, like the previous one, was a semi-technocratic government and the partners were Republican People's Party (CHP), Justice Party (AP), and National Reliance Party (MGP)

The government

Aftermath
Nihat Erim resigned on 27 March 1972, but continued to serve as caretaker prime minister until the formation of the next government. After Suat Hayri Ürgüplü's unsuccessful efforts, the next government was founded by Ferit Melen, a member of the first and the second Erim governments.

References

Cabinets of Turkey
1971 establishments in Turkey
1972 disestablishments in Turkey
Cabinets established in 1971
Cabinets disestablished in 1972
Coalition governments of Turkey
Members of the 34th government of Turkey
14th parliament of Turkey